Pope Adrian VI (r. 1522–1523) created one new cardinal, the last cardinal from the Netherlands until the 20th century.

At a consistory held on 10 September 1523, just four days before he died, Adrian created one cardinal of the order of cardinal priests.

 Willem van Enckevoirt (1464–1534)

References

External links 

Adrian VI
College of Cardinals
16th-century Catholicism